Pseudocalotes saravacensis is a species of agamid lizard. It is found in Malaysia.

References

Pseudocalotes
Reptiles of Malaysia
Reptiles described in 1994
Taxa named by Robert F. Inger
Reptiles of Borneo